FC Wangen bei Olten is a Swiss football club based in Wangen bei Olten. The club has played in Nationalliga B (2nd level), and currently plays at 1. Liga (Group 2) (4th level).

Recent seasons
2000–01: Nationalliga B 7th in Abstiegsrunde (relegated)
2001–07: 1. Liga

Stadium
The club play their home games in Sportplatz Chrüzmatt. It has a capacity of 3,000. 300 are seating and 2,700 is for standing.

Current squad

Coach : Edvaldo Della Casa

Notable players

External links
Official Website 
Soccerway profile 

Wangen bei Olten
Wangen bei Olten
Canton of Solothurn
1930 establishments in Switzerland